Château d'Urdain is located on the Bayonne–Ustaritz road close to the west bank of the river Nive. It was built in the early 19th century and was the home of Dominique Joseph Garat a French writer and revolutionary politician who was for a time Minister of Justice.

The Château, known to British troops as "Garat's House", was occupied by British soldiers during Wellington's advance into France in late 1813 while the nearby Urdain brook (a western tributary of the Nieve) was the front line.

Notes

References

Further reading
 — modern description and location next to the club house of Makila Golf Club.

Northern Basque Country
Peninsular War